Heiko Braak (born 16 June 1937) is a German anatomist. Braak was born in Kiel, Schleswig-Holstein, and studied medicine at the universities of Hamburg, Berlin, and Kiel. He was Professor at the Institute of Clinical Neuroanatomy, Johann Wolfgang Goethe-University, Frankfurt am Main. Currently he is based at the 'Clinical Neuroanatomy Section, Department of Neurology, Center for Biomedical Research, University of Ulm, Germany.

Braak's early research focused on the morphology of the central nervous system of chondrichthyan fishes. In the holocephalan species Chimaera monstrosa (ratfish), he described, in the basal midline of the diencephalon, a previously unknown ependymall structure adjacent to the rostral part of the optic chiasma referred to as the ‘organon vasculare praeopticum’. It may be considered homologous to the supraoptic crest of mammals. Braak also described the morphology of the neurohypophysial complex of the squaliform elasmobranch Etmopterus spinax (Spinax niger).

Braak’s further research has focused on the morphology and pathoanatomy of the human central nervous system, in particular of the cerebral cortex (1980).

Braak has also contributed extensively to the neuropathology of Alzheimer's disease and Parkinson's disease. In particular, he and his wife Eva Braak introduced a classification of Alzheimer's disease into six distinct pathoanatomical stages, now commonly referred to as Braak and Braak stages, based on the topographical distribution pattern of neurofibrillary changes from circumscribed parts of the limbic system to the higher neocortical association fields. A similar classification was proposed in 2003 for the pathoanatomical changes associated with idiopathic Parkinson's disease.

Braak and his wife, Eva Braak, were the first to describe the pathological changes of argyrophilic grain disease, a previously unknown form of senile dementia.

in 2007, Braak and co-authors advanced a ‘dual-hit hypothesis’ about the pathogenesis of idiopathic Parkinson's disease, according to which an unknown pathogen akin to a slow-virus may enter the nervous system through both the nasal and intestinal mucosae, eventually resulting in a cascade of neurodegenerative events in the brain.

Braak is the son of the philologist Professor Ivo Braak (1906–1991) and brother of theatre director Dr. Kai Braak.

References

1937 births
Living people
German ichthyologists
Alzheimer's disease researchers
German medical researchers
German anatomists
German neuroscientists
Physicians from Kiel
Academic staff of Goethe University Frankfurt
Parkinson's disease researchers
People from the Province of Schleswig-Holstein
Commanders Crosses of the Order of Merit of the Federal Republic of Germany